Jade tree may refer to:
the jade plant, Crassula ovata
the dwarf jade plant, Portulacaria afra
Jade Tree (record label)